Mona Vasu (born 15 October 1985), sometimes spelled Mona Wasu, is an Indian television actress. She is best known for having played the role of the title character Miilee in the TV series Miilee on STAR Plus.

Early life
She completed her degree in Sociology from Sri Venkateswara College, New Delhi in 2003. She moved to Mumbai to pursue a career in acting.

Career

Television
Mona Vasu started her TV career in 2003 by appearing in many ads for major brands. She hosted the weekly travel show Operation Gold from 2003 to 2004 on STAR Gold. The concept of the show was to know about the life of soldiers in the Indian Army. She played a leading role in the 2004 Sahara One telefilm 30 Day Trial. This light hearted rom-com was the story of a much-in-love couple, Nikhil (Kabir Sadanand) and Shailee (Mona Vasu), who are given an opportunity by their fathers, to live together for 30 days, before they decide to actually marry. Co-written by Suhana Bhatia and Rajen Makhijani, this film was nominated for 'Best Script' at the Indian Telly Awards that year.

Between 2005 and 2006, she played the title role in the primetime daily serial Miilee on Star Plus. In 2007, she hosted the weekly songs countdown show Idea Ek Se Bad Kar Ek on Star One which included categories like 'Top 10 Action Heroes', 'Top 10 Love Triangles' and 'Top 10 Sizzling Singles'.

She played the role of Savita in the TV serial Jamegi Jodi.com on 9X who is the daughter of Sulbha Arya who runs a match fixing agency, Bandhan. She also did an episodic role in the horror show Ssshhhh...Koi Hai. From 2008 to 2009, she played the role of Rohini, the eldest daughter, in the prime time soap opera Radhaa Ki Betiyaan Kuch Kar Dikhayengi on NDTV Imagine. In 2009, Vasu starred in an episode of Specials @ 10 on Sony TV.

The actress shot to fame when she won the reality show Iss Jungle Se Mujhe Bachao (the Indian version of I'm A Celebrity, Get Me Out of Here) in 2009.
She played the role of the antagonist, Richa Thakral in Balaji Telefilms' Parichay.
She was cast in the play, Red Hot directed by Saurabh Shukla which is an adaptation of a comedy play by Neil Simon, Last of the Red Hot Lovers. It was played in 2011 at Kamani in New Delhi, at Bharat Mahaotsav, the largest theatre festival in Asia and at Chaos, the annual festival of IIM Ahmedabad.

Films
Mona Wasu made her film debut in the 2013 film Maazii.

Filmography

Television (fiction)

Reality TV shows

Awards and nominations

References

External links
 

1982 births
Living people
Actresses from Kozhikode
I'm a Celebrity...Get Me Out of Here! winners
Indian television actresses
Actresses in Hindi television
Indian film actresses
Actresses in Hindi cinema
21st-century Indian actresses